Theophil Ruderstaller (1906, in Ostermiething, Upper Austria; † 10 June 1946, in Fuxin, China) was a capuchin and China missionary.

In 2005, Bishop Joseph Wei from Qiqihar - since 2002 apostolic administrator of the former Capuchin mission Kiamusze (Jiamusi) - told Gaudentius Walser from the North Tyrolean Capuchin province that two coffins with the corpses of Theophil Ruderstaller (Ostermiething) and Antonin Schörcksnadel (Innsbruck) had been found while digging a fountain in the garden of a private house. On July 10, 1946, they were shot in the parsonage.

Currently, there is a beatification running for Theophil Ruderstaller.

Literature 
 Hermenegild Hintringer: Der oberösterreichische Chinamissionar und Märtyrer P. Theophil Ruderstaller († 1946). In: Neues Archiv für die Geschichte der Diözese Linz Jg. 1 (1981/82), S. 62–75.
 Hermenegild Hintringer: P. Theophil Ruderstaller OFM Cap. von Ostermiething. Ein ehemaliger Petriner und Blutzeuge für die katholische Kirche in China. In: Gedenkschrift zum 50. Schuljahr des Bischöflichen Gymnasiums am Kollegium Petrinum, Linz 1954, S. 82–83.
 Gisela Gensch: 'Lu Shen Fu – der Missionar', Dokumentarischer Roman mit 340 interessanten teilweise historischen Abbildungen, Anmerkungen, Anhang, Originalbriefkopien von Bruder Theophil aus China, Bibliographie; 584 Seiten, 2009, Dr. Bachmaier Verlag München,

References

External links 
 Ihr gewaltsamer Tod wird zum Samen neuen Lebens

1906 births
1946 deaths
20th-century Austrian people
Capuchin missionaries in China
Austrian Roman Catholic missionaries
Austrian expatriates in China
People from Braunau am Inn District